The Riddle of the Sphinx (German: Das Rätsel der Sphinx) is a 1921 German silent adventure film directed by Adolf Gärtner and starring Ellen Richter, Erich Kaiser-Titz and Karl Günther.

The film's sets were designed by the art director Hans Dreier.

Cast
 Ellen Richter as Juanita di Conchitas 
 Erich Kaiser-Titz as Amru, an Egyptian 
 Karl Günther as Dr. Percy Grey 
 Albert Patry as Prof. Grey, British Museum 
 Georg John as Mummy 
 Kurt Rottenburg as Dr. Edward Pattison 
 Georg Baselt as Don Martunez de la Blanca 
 Henry Bender as Empfangschef 
 Irmgard Bern as Daisy Pattison 
 Carl Geppert as Baron Kollwitz 
 Károly Huszár as Fürst Popoff 
 Max Kronert as Mehemed 
 Maria Lux as Miss Peach 
 Hermann Picha as Marquis d'Yssé

References

Bibliography
 Berman, Nina. German Literature on the Middle East: Discourses and Practices, 1000-1989. University of Michigan Press, 2011.

External links

1921 films
Films of the Weimar Republic
Films directed by Adolf Gärtner
German silent feature films
UFA GmbH films
1921 adventure films
German adventure films
German black-and-white films
Mummy films
Silent adventure films
Silent horror films
1920s German films